This is a listing of the horses that finished in either first, second, or third place and the number of starters in the Deputed Testamony Stakes, an American stakes race for three-year-olds at one mile on dirt held at Pimlico Race Course in Baltimore, Maryland.  (List 1986-present)

See also 
 List of graded stakes at Pimlico Race Course

References

 The Federico Tesio Stakes at Pedigree Query
 The 2007 Federico Tesio Stakes at Thoroughbred Times

Lists of horse racing results
Pimlico Race Course